Osvaldo Melendez Jr, known professionally as Ozzie Melendez, was born in Brooklyn, New York, to parents from Orocovis, Puerto Rico (father) and Rio Grande (mother). Ozzie grew up in Lindenhurst, Long Island, and is the youngest of two.

Ozzie began playing the trombone at the age of 9 at the E.W. Bower Elementary School, excelling at his craft and receiving many accolades, one of them being 'The Louis Armstrong Award', then became a member of the "All State Band" and soon after was chosen to become part of the McDonald's Tri-State Jazz Ensemble. He then went to study at the Berklee College of Music.

Career
He has been a highly regarded session player since the mid-1980s. Ozzie began touring internationally with Emmanuel and Willie Colon through the 1980s. He has been a member of Latin superstar Marc Anthony’s band since 2002 while fitting in tours with Willie Colon, Diana Ross as well as Blood, Sweat & Tears . Melendez has performed all over the world as a vocalist, trombonist, composer and music director as well as playing on Broadway shows, movie soundtracks, commercials, and TV shows. All of his work has put him on the top of the “must work with list that has garnered him studio time with some of the biggest hit makers of today. He has worked on Gold and platinum records that belong to Mariah Carey, Jessica Simpson, Jennifer Lopez, Billy Joel, Bruce Springsteen and Marc Anthony. On top of working on top-selling albums, he has toured with Celia Cruz, Willie Colon, Diana Ross and Marc Anthony.

Most recent activities
Melendez has toured with Marc Anthony since 2002 and Willie Colon since 1990, while filling in dates with Blood Sweat & Tears and Diana Ross since 2017, he also found time to release his own musical adventures. His album released in May 2017. He states that the style of music in this album should be considered an alchemy of music and its recipe was his life's work of musical experiences. The title is The Fusion & The Alchemy Of Music.

Album credits
2019  Opus  -Marc Anthony  - Trombone
2019  Lilyhammer the Score, Vol. 2: Folk, Rock, Rio, Bits and Pieces [Original TV Soundtrack] Little Steven / Little Steven & the Interstellar Jazz Renegades - Trombone
2018  NYC Disco - Little Louis Vega - Soloist, Trombone
2017  The Way I Hear It | Michael Cavanaugh | Horn
2016  Groovin' | Peter White | Trombone
2016  Louie Vega Starring...XXVIII | "Little" Louie Vega | Trombone
2015  Los Duo, Vol. 2 | Juan Gabriel | Coros, Trombone
2013  3.0 | Marc Anthony | Trombone
2013  Eclipse | Elements of Life | Horn Arrangements, Soloist, Trombone
2013  The Complete Album Collection | Paul Simon | Trombone
2012  Love This Giant | David Byrne / St. Vincent | Trombone
2011  Mad Styles & Crazy Visions 2 | "Little" Louie Vega | Trombone
2011  Original | José Alberto "El Canario" | Trombone
2010  Asalto: Reloaded | Eddy-K | Trombone
2010  Historias de Amor | Angel Lopez | Trombone
2009  718 Sessions | Danny Krivit | Trombone
2009  Ananésworld | Anané | Horn Arrangements, Trombone
2009  Down the Wire | Spyro Gyra | Trombone
2009  The Last | Aventura | Trombone
2009  The Real Thing | Vanessa Williams | Trombone, Contractor
2008    Everybody Get Down | [http://www.funkfilharmonik.com Funk Filharmonik | Writer, Arranger, Producer, Engineer, Trombone, BK Vocals
2008  Asalto Navideño: En Vivo Puerto Rico 1993 | Willie Colón | Trombone
2008  El Malo, Vol. 2: Prisioneros del Mambo | Willie Colón | Producer, Musical Director, Arranger, Bass, Coro, Drums, Strings, Synthesizer, Trombone
2008  Gravity at Last | Ayọ | Trombone
2007  All That I Am | Sandy Zio | Trombone
2007  Blame It on the City | Eren Cannata | Trombone, Horn Arrangements
2007  Decades, Vol. 1: Love Songs of the 70's | Donny Osmond | Main Personnel, Trombone
2007  El Cantante | Marc Anthony | Trombone
2007  Juega Billar | 8 y Mas | Trombone
2007  Lust: A Personal Collection by Louie Vega | "Little" Louie Vega | Guitar, Soloist
2007  Percussion Maddness Revisited | Luisito Quintero | Trombone, Soloist
2007  Ten Songs About Love | Eran James | Trombone
2006  A Public Affair | Jessica Simpson | Trombone
2006  Hey Man, Merry Christmas | John Signorello | Trombone
2006  Ketukuba | Africando | Trombone
2006  La Nueva Combinacion | Transito | Trombone
2006  Percussion Madness | Luisito Quintero | Main Personnel, Trombone
2006  Playin' Favorites | Peter White | Trombone
2006  Sigo Siendo Yo: Grandes Exitos | Marc Anthony | Trombone
2006  Soy   | India | Trombone
2006  The Underdog/El Subestimado | Tego Calderón | Trombone
2005  Atrevete  Olvidarme | Brenda K. Starr | Trombone
2005  Connected: Mixed by Jay-J  | Horn
2005  Defected in the House: Eivissa 05 | Simon Dunmore | Horn
2005  Defected in the House: International Edition, Vol. 2 | Horn
2005  From Law Suite to Love Songs | Len Leeds | Trombone
2005  My Lives | Billy Joel | Trombone
2005  Nightlife | Paul Taylor | Trombone
2005  On Your Level: The Ultimate Quality Soulful And Funky House Selection | Horn
2004  Common Ground | Barry Danielian | Main Personnel, Trombone
2004  Little Things | Toby Lightman | Trombone
2004  On the 6/J.Lo | Jennifer Lopez | Horn, Trombone
2004  Rasin Kreyol | Emeline Michel  Main Personnel, Trombone
2004  Solohits: Salsa and Dance Latin Hits Remix | Trombone
2003  Confesiones | Obie Bermúdez | Trombone
2003  Don't Get It Twisted | Son Callejero | Trombone
2003  Latin Grammy Nominees 2003: Latin Pop and Tropical | Trombone
2003  Look Again | Nelson Rangell | Trombone
2003  Martina | Africando | Trombone
2003  Music for My Peoples | Huey Dunbar | Trombone
2003  Siguiendo la Tradicion | Los Soneros del Barrio | Trombone
2002  2002 Latin Grammy Nominees | Trombone
2002  Billboard Hot Latin Tracks: Best of Tropical 2001 | Trombone
2002  Caraluna | Bacilos | Trombone
2002  SB4 | Son by 4 | Trombone
2002  Thalia  |Thalía | Trombone
2002  The Shadow of the Cat | Gato Barbieri | Trombone
2002  The Time Is Right | 3-2 Get Funky | Trombone
2002  Transparente | Luis Enrique | Trombone
2002  Un Gran Dia en el Barrio | Spanish Harlem Orchestra | Trombone
2001  En Otra Onda | Tito Nieves | Trombone
2001  Intenso | Gilberto Santa Rosa | Trombone
2001  J.Lo | Jennifer Lopez | Trombone, Horn
2001  La Negra Tiene Tumbao | Celia Cruz | Trombone
2001  Libre | Marc Anthony | Trombone
2001  Plays Swing, Sweet and Sentimental | The Ben Grisafi Big Band | Trombone
2001  Por Tu Placer | Frankie Negron | Trombone
2001  Say You'll Always Remember | The Ben Grisafi Big Band | Trombone
2001  Songs from the Black House | John Carlin | Trombone
2001  Un Chico Malo |Charlie Cruz | Trombone
2001  Yo Si Me Enamore | Huey Dunbar | Trombone
2000  Asi Soy | Charlie Cruz | Trombone
2000  Best Kept Secret | Ralph Irizarry / Timbalaye | Trombone
2000  Calle Nueva | New Street | Trombone
2000  En Vivo Desde el Carnegie Hall | Lucecita Benitez | Trombone
2000  Galeria Caribe | Ricardo Arjona | Trombone
2000  Mandali | Africando | Trombone
2000  Mi Gran Sueno | Dominic | Trombone
2000  Pru | Pru | Horn
2000  Son by Four | Son by 4 | Trombone
2000  The Groovesmith | Omar Hakim | Trombone
1999  Dejame Entrar | Ley Alejandro | Trombone
1999  En Vivo Desde El Carnegie Hall | Danny Rivera | Trombone
1999  Gotcha  DLG (Dark Latin Groove) | Trombone
1999  Imagínate | Charlie Cruz | Trombone
1999  Inconfundible | Víctor Manuelle | Trombone
1999  Lo Que Llevo Por Dentro | Frankie Negron | Trombone
1999  Un Poco Mas | Corrine | Trombone
1998  1998 Latin Grammy Nominees | Trombone
1998  Dale Cara a la Vida | Tito Nieves | Vocals (Background)
1998  Demasiado Corazon | Willie Colón | Trombone
1998  Let's Go Do What Happens | Francis Dunnery | Trombone
1998  Mi Propia Aventura | Charlie Cardona | Trombone
1998  No Me Compares | Frankie Negron | Trombone
1998  San Bonan | Bakithi Kumalo | Trombone
1998  Sir George Collection  | Trombone
1998  These Are Special Times | Céline Dion | Trombone
1998  Tjader-ized: A Cal Tjader Tribute | Dave Samuels | Trombone
1998  Un Estilo Propio | Johnny Rivera | Trombone
1998  Vincent Laguardia Gambini Sings Just for You | Joe Pesci | Trombone
1997  Extrano Sentimiento | Patricia Loaiza | Trombone
1997  I Like It Like That | Tito Nieves | Vocals (Background)
1997  Mi Confidente | Corrine | Trombone
1997  Mi Encuentro | Yolandita Monge | Trombone
1997  Reconfirmando | Andreu Johnny Almendra  | Trombone
1997  Regreso Al Futuro | Jomar | Trombone, Primary Artist
1997  Sobre el Fuego | India | Trombone
1997  Songs from The Capeman | Paul Simon | Trombone
1997  Swing On | DLG (Dark Latin Groove) | Trombone
1997  Tempo (Remixes+Versoes) | Pedro Abrunhosa / Pedro Abrunhosa & Os Bandemónio | Trombone, Soloist
1996  Celebremos Navidad | Yomo Toro | Trombone
1996  Dark Latin Groove | DLG (Dark Latin Groove) | Trombone
1996  Electric Lady | Nora Nora | Trombone
1996  Tempo | Pedro Abrunhosa / Pedro Abrunhosa & Os Bandemónio | Trombone, Crowd Noise
1996  Tony White | Tony White | Trombone
1995  Arrebatame | Roy Tavare | Vocals
1995  Souled Out | Tower of Power | Composer, Horn Arrangements
1995  Think With Your Heart | Debbie Gibson | Trombone
 1994  Esta Aventura | Emmanuel | Arranger, Trombone
 1994  Frio | Robi Rosa | Trombone
 1992  Don't Call Me Buckwheat | Garland Jeffreys | Trumpet, Trombone
 1990  Stiletto | Lita Ford | Vocals (Background)
 Adverse Times | Carl Fischer / Organic Groove Ensemble | Trombone
 Deluxe Edition | Richie Cannata | Composer, Horn Arrangements, Trombone
 Richie Cannata | Richie Cannata | Composer
 Te Voy a Enamorar | Rik Indio | Trombone

References

External links 

 

Year of birth missing (living people)
Living people
American trombonists
Male trombonists
21st-century trombonists
21st-century American male musicians